Season 2 of Dance Plus premiered on 2 July 2016 on Star Plus. It was created and produced by Varun Trikha Productions, Urban Brew Studios and Frames Production and aired for 25 episodes. This time there were two talents from Nepal who progressed to the Grand Finale (Wild Ripperz Crew and Sushant Khatri). Mokshda Jailkhani was the first contestant to get the double plus. Wild Ripperz set the record by gaining Double Plus for 8 consecutive time. Auditions were conducted across several cities of India from 3 May 2016 to 26 May 2016. This show was hosted by Raghav Juyal.

Winner
Tanay Malhara of team Dharmesh is India's new dance icon.
Wild Ripperz Crew of team Dharmesh are the first runners-up.
Piyush Bhagat of team Shakti is the second runner-up.
Sushant Khatri of team Shakti is the third runner-up.

Super judge
Remo D'Souza was the super judge for this season also. He is well known and reputed choreographer and film director. He has directed movies like F.A.L.T.U., Any Body Can Dance (ABCD 1 and ABCD 2), A Flying Jatt and Race 3. He was also judge on Jhalak Dikhla Ja and Dance India Dance (Season 1, Season 2 and Season3). He has judged many dance shows previously.

Mentors
There are three mentors on the show
Dharmesh Yelande 
Shakti Mohan 
Punit Pathak

All the three Mentors have their own team consisting of contestants selected in auditions. Only one winner is chosen from all the teams at the end of the competition.

Teams

Top 8 progress

Top 4 
 Piyush Bhagat - 11 September 2016
 Wild Ripperz Crew from Nepal - 18 September 2016
 Sushant Khatri - 18 September 2016
 Tanay Malhara

Final results
1st Tanay Malhara From Jalgaon.
2nd Wild Ripperz Crew From Nepal.
3rd Piyush Bhagat from Jammu 
4th Sushant Khatri from Nepal.

Celebrity guests

References

2016 Indian television seasons